Department of Labour is a Bangladesh government regulatory agency under the Ministry of Labour and Employment responsible for regulating the labour market in Bangladesh. Goutom Kumar is the director general of the Department of Labour.

History
Directorate of Labour was established in 1931 by the British Raj government and was upgraded in 1958 by the Government of Pakistan. The directorate was upgrade to a department in 2017.

The department has the authority to register unions in Bangladesh and its decisions can be challenged at the Labour Appellate Tribunal.

References

1931 establishments in India
Organisations based in Dhaka
Government agencies of Bangladesh
Government departments of Bangladesh
Ministry of Labour and Employment (Bangladesh)